Negatives is a 1968 British drama film directed by Peter Medak. Based on the 1961 novel Negatives by Peter Everett, it features Peter McEnery and Glenda Jackson as Theo and Vivien, a couple who act out their erotic fantasies by dressing up as the Edwardian murderer Hawley Harvey Crippen and his lover Ethel le Neve. Diane Cilento plays Reingard, a German photographer who becomes involved in their private world.

Cast
Peter McEnery as Theo
Diane Cilento as Reingard
Glenda Jackson as Vivien
Billy Russell as Old Man
Norman Rossington as Auctioneer
Stephen Lewis as The Dealer 
Maurice Denham as The Father

Critical reception
In The New York Times, Vincent Canby found the film "so good in so many of its particulars that it is hard to believe that it finally goes so wrong with such a straight face...It actually is quite a good movie until it is taken over by the fantasies—and by the anxious hand of a young (31 years old) director who wants to make a meaningful film. 'Negatives' is the first feature by Peter Medak and much of what he does is excellent. The movie has the careful tempo of a minuet, which counterpoints its desperate eroticism. It is beautifully photographed with the same tactile quality that may have been the only really distinguishing feature of 'Blow-Up.' and it is played by three performers who are always interesting to watch"; while more recently, Dennis Schwartz wrote, "It's a fun watch because it's carried off with such glee, just don't expect any help from the story getting to any significant psychological meanings and be prepared to see how much you like the film when it turns ugly."

References

External links

1968 films
Films directed by Peter Medak
Films scored by Basil Kirchin
1968 directorial debut films
British drama films
1968 drama films
Films about sexuality
1960s English-language films
1960s British films